Voice of Youth Advocates (VOYA) is a bimonthly magazine that provides book reviews and information for librarians with a focus on young adult materials.

History and profile
VOYA was established in 1978. The founders are Dorothy Broderick and Mary K. Chelton. The magazine is published by E L Kurdyla Publishing and has its headquarters in Lanham, Maryland. Kurdyla acquired VOYA from Scarecrow Press in 2010.

The magazine includes reviews of young adult and children's literature. It also contributes to the awards, grants and scholarships program of the American Library Association.

See also

References

External links
 
 WorldCat record

Library science magazines
Magazines established in 1978
Young adult literature
Bimonthly magazines published in the United States
English-language magazines
Book review magazines
Literary magazines published in the United States
Magazines published in Maryland